Anda Rottenberg (born 23 April 1944) is a Polish art historian, art critic, writer, former director of the Zachęta National Gallery of Art in Warsaw and member of the International Association of Art Critics (AICA), International "Manifesta" Foundation and the International "Germinations" Foundation.

Biography 
Anda Rottenberg was born in 1944. Her mother was Russian from Petersburg and her father was a Polish Jew from the town of Nowy Sącz. All of his family was murdered during the Holocaust.

Rottenberg grew up in Legnica. In 1963, she moved to Warsaw, where she began studying history of art at the University of Warsaw.

She wrote two books - Sztuka w Polsce 1945-2005 (en. "Art in Poland 1945-2005") and an autobiography Proszę bardzo! (en. "You're welcome!"). The main reason for writing the latter book was her anger at the police who were unable to find the body of her son (he was a drug addict and died in unknown circumstances). In her autobiography, Rottenberg also wrote about her mother, who survived the siege of Stalingrad [?] during World War II and was sentenced to prison for stealing a few spoons of food: she met there her future husband, Rottenberg's father.

Anda Rottenberg received the Officer's Cross Order of Polonia Restituta (2001), the Commander's Cross Order of Polonia Restituta (2011), Aleksander Gieysztor Prize (2013), and Medal for Merit to Culture – Gloria Artis (2014).

References 

1944 births
Living people
Polish art historians
20th-century Polish Jews
Polish women writers
University of Warsaw alumni
Women art historians
Polish curators
Polish people of Jewish descent